Agelasta latefasciata is a species of beetle in the family Cerambycidae. It was described by Stephan von Breuning in 1939. It is known from Vietnam.

References

latefasciata
Beetles described in 1939